Richard Upex (26 June 1892 – 22 May 1979) was an English professional footballer who played in the Football League for Charlton Athletic as an inside left. He also played Southern League football for Croydon Common and Southend United.

Personal life 
Upex worked as a sugar boiler in the confectionery trade. He served as a private with the Football Battalion of the Middlesex Regiment during the First World War and saw action at High Wood, Vimy Ridge, Loos, Cambrai and Lens. He also served in the Labour Corps. In 1937, Upex was working as a commission agent and during the 1950s he ran a turf accountancy business.

Career statistics

References

1892 births
Sportspeople from Peterborough
1979 deaths
English footballers
Association football inside forwards
Peterborough & Fletton United F.C. players
Croydon Common F.C. players
Leyton Orient F.C. players
Tottenham Hotspur F.C. players
Southend United F.C. players
Charlton Athletic F.C. players
Southern Football League players
English Football League players
British Army personnel of World War I
Middlesex Regiment soldiers
Royal Pioneer Corps soldiers
Military personnel from Cambridgeshire